Ralph Harper McKee (June 20, 1874 – February 24, 1967)  was a professor at the department of chemical engineering at Columbia University. He was the first person to be awarded a patent for a novel plant.

Biography
He was born on June 20, 1874, in Missouri to James T. McKee and Mary Frances Ricketts.

In 1923 he and Max Kahn developed a novel fat substitute, called intarvin.

He was married, and in 1928 he and his wife divorced.

By 1932 he was in the department of chemical engineering at Columbia University where he was able to manufacture diamonds "larger than ever before produced artificially" and was able to produce artificial wool from jute.

In 1938 he received the first patent issued for a novel plant variety.

He died on February 24, 1967, in Manhattan, New York.

Footnotes 

1874 births
1967 deaths
Columbia University faculty
American chemical engineers
Synthetic diamond